Edwin Nii Lante Vanderpuye (born 11 June 1965) is a Ghanaian sports journalist and politician and the current Member of Parliament of the Odododiodio constituency. He served as Minister of Youth and Sports and as Deputy Minister of Trade and Industry in the John Dramani Mahama's  government.

Education
He is an alumnus of Bechem Presbyterian Boys' Secondary School and Mfantsipim School, Cape Coast. He holds a master's degree in Governance & Leadership from Ghana Institute of Management and Public Administration (GIMPA) and a B.A. in English, Philosophy and Classics from the University of Ghana.

Career 
From 1990 to 2004, he worked at the Ghana Broadcasting Corporation where he became the Deputy Head of Sports. Between 2005 and 2008, he was the Head of Sports at Network Broadcasting Limited.

Political career 
He was a special aide and director of operations at the presidency under former President of Ghana President Mills and also the former Deputy Minister for Trade and Industry under John Mahama.

Member of Parliament 
He was elected as MP during the 2012 elections, where he faced off against Victor Okaikoi of the New Patriotic Party. Vanderpuye was quite confident about his chances of winning, famously stating in November 2012 that if he got less than 65% of the vote, he would concede the seat to Okaikoi. In the end, Vanderpuye won by a smaller landslide than expected, with 45,967 votes (63%) against 26,269 (36%) for Okaikoi and 745 (1%) for Emmanuel Odoi of the Convention People's Party.

In December 2016 he was retained as the member of Parliament for the Odododiodio Constituency with 36,606 votes representing 57.04% against his closest contender the New Patriotic Party whose candidate, had 26,671 votes representing 41.56%. He serves in Parliament as the ranking member on Local Government and Rural Development Committee and as member on the Privileges committee and Appointments committee.

Deputy Minister to Minister Youth and Sports 
In March 2013, was appointed as Deputy Minister for Trade and Industry under the John Mahama government. He served in that role until 2014 when he was moved to serve as Deputy Minister for Local Government and Rural Development where he served until 2015.  After a ministerial reshuffle in 2015, Vanderpuye was named by John Dramani Mahama as Minister of Youth and Sports to replace Dr. Mustapha Ahmed.

References

Living people
National Democratic Congress (Ghana) politicians
Ghanaian civil servants
Mfantsipim School alumni
Ga-Adangbe people
Vanderpuije family of Ghana
People from Accra
Ghanaian people of Dutch descent
1965 births
Ghanaian MPs 2021–2025